Northeast Boating Magazine was a regional magazine focused on boating and leisure in New England and the US East Coast. It was a sister publication to Chesapeake Bay Magazine and covered parallel topics, such as boat reviews, information on marinas, marine services, and coastal destinations.

Background
The magazine was based in Quincy, Massachusetts. It was renamed Northeast Boating Magazine in 2007, having been founded as Offshore Magazine. The name change was aimed at dialing in on the magazine's key demographic, i.e., northeast boaters.

Awards
At the 2008 Boating Writers International Excellence in Boating Journalism contest, Northeast Boating took home 8 awards.

Other
The December 2009 issue of Northeast Boating Magazine was its last, having succumbed to pressure from a tough economy and shrinking boating market.

See also
Sailing
Fishing
Yacht racing

Notes and references

External links
 Northeast Boating Magazine

Sports magazines published in the United States
Boating magazines
Defunct magazines published in the United States
Magazines established in 2007
Magazines disestablished in 2009
Magazines published in Massachusetts